Gwee Li Sui (born 22 August 1970) is a poet, a graphic artist, and a literary critic from Singapore.

Biography 

Gwee went to the now-defunct MacRitchie Primary School and then Anglo-Chinese Secondary School and Anglo-Chinese Junior College. In 1995, he graduated from the National University of Singapore with a First-Class Honours degree in English literature and was awarded the NUS Society Gold Medal for Best Student in English. His Honours thesis was on Günter Grass's novel The Tin Drum (German: Die Blechtrommel). His Master's thesis was on Hermann Broch's novel The Death of Virgil (German: Der Tod des Vergil).

In 1999, Gwee began his doctoral research on the period from the English Enlightenment to early German Romanticism at Queen Mary, University of London. His eventual thesis was on the discursive influence of Newtonianism on the poetry of Richard Blackmore, Alexander Pope, and Novalis. From 2003 to 2009, he worked as an assistant professor at the NUS Department of English Language and Literature.

Gwee has been a full-time writer since leaving academia. A popular speaker, he continues to instruct at various universities and institutions. He is sought for his opinions on literature, language, and religion and has been on the evaluation panel for several top literary awards in Singapore, Southeast Asia, and East Asia. In 2010, he was an international writer- and critic-in-residence at the Toji Cultural Centre in South Korea.

Between 2008 and 2011, Gwee hosted public interviews with Singaporean cultural figures at the independent bookstore BooksActually. Between 2013 and 2017, he ran The Arts House's "Sing Lit 101: How to Read a Singaporean Poem" and gave five seasons of public lectures on important Singaporean poems. Since 2018, he leads the National Library Board's "How to Fall in Love with Classics" series, which focuses on literary classics in different mediums and genres. He also fronts Yahoo! Singapore's flagship TV programme "Singlish with Uncle Gwee".

Works 

Gwee wrote what is considered Singapore’s first long-form graphic novel in English Myth of the Stone, published in 1993. Earlier such collections had involved short comic stories. Myth of the Stone is part-children's story, part-fantasy, and part-allegory and follows a boy's adventures in a realm of mismatched mythical creatures. A twentieth-anniversary edition, with two new related stories among its bonuses, was published by Epigram Books in 2013.

Gwee's poetry is known for its versatility and involves a wide range of styles and moods. His first book of verse was the well-loved Who Wants to Buy a Book of Poems?, published in 1998. It is full of linguistic play, Singlish rhymes, and jabs at social history and culture. About half of Who Wants to Buy an Expanded Edition of a Book of Poems?, published in 2015, concerns all the poems that could not be published in the first edition. The Straits Times named it one of the 50 greatest works of Singaporean literature in 2021.

Gwee also famously writes on and in Singlish. In 2017, He published Spiaking Singlish: A Companion to How Singaporeans Communicate, which is hailed by pioneering Singlish writer Sylvia Toh as "the definitive book on Singlish". In 2019, he translated Antoine de Saint-Exupéry's The Little Prince into Singlish. The Leeter Tunku became the first literary classic to appear in Singlish. In 2021, his translations of Beatrix Potter's The Tale of Peter Rabbit and selections from the Brothers Grimm's Children's and Household Tales were released.

As an editor, Gwee worked on one of two seminal volumes on Singaporean and Malaysian literature in English Sharing Borders: Studies in Contemporary Singaporean-Malaysian Literature, published in 2009. His introduction exposes the problems of ideology that continue to plague the countries' literature in the name of postcolonial studies.

In 2010, Gwee edited the popular fiction collection Telltale: Eleven Stories, which was adopted as a Literature O-Level text. In 2011, his human rights-based anthology Man/Born/Free: Writings on the Human Spirit from Singapore pays tribute to the life of Nelson Mandela and was launched in Cape Town, South Africa. In 2015, he edited the two-volume Singathology: 50 New Works by Celebrated Singaporean Writers, a commemoration of Singapore's golden jubilee.

Controversies 

In 2009, during the AWARE Saga, Gwee wrote an influential Facebook note to advise fellow Christians against supporting covert action. The AWARE saga was an event in Singapore's feminist, human rights, and LGBT history that involved the leadership of Association of Women for Action and Research. In his note, Gwee objected to imposing religious beliefs on a secular organisation and warned against the implications on Christian witness.

In 2014, the National Library Board controversially announced that it was pulping three children's books following a user's complaint that they had LGBT themes that undermined family values. Gwee, with fellow writers Adrian Tan, Prem Anand, and Felix Cheong, cancelled their library event on humour. He further declined to give his keynote speech at a National Schools Literature Festival that weekend. Two books were eventually moved to the adults' section.

In 2014, when Gwee was among the Singapore Literature Prize's English poetry judges, poet Grace Chia, whose collection Cordelia was shortlisted, accused the prize of sexism. Gwee responded by saying, "All entries have an equal chance of consideration for winning, and we discussed it based on that point alone, and on the strengths of the collections." The other poetry judges were prominent female poet Leong Liew Geok and poet Boey Kim Cheng. Gwee, in fact, wrote the preface to Cordelia.

In 2016, Gwee wrote an editorial in The New York Times on the growth of Singlish through the years. It was responded to in a statement by the Press Secretary of the Prime Minister of Singapore and sparked a national debate.

Select bibliography

Graphic novels
 Myth of the Stone (East Asia Book Services, 1993) 
 Myth of the Stone: 20th Anniversary Edition (Epigram Books, 2013) 
 Old Man Solve Mystery (Self-published, 2018)

Poetry
 Who Wants to Buy a Book of Poems? (Landmark Books, 1998) 
 One Thousand and One Nights (Landmark Books, 2014) 
 Who Wants to Buy an Expanded Edition of a Book of Poems? (Landmark Books, 2015) 
 The Other Merlion and Friends (Landmark Books, 2015) 
 Haikuku (Landmark Books, 2017) 
 Death Wish (Landmark Books, 2017) 
 This Floating World (Landmark Books, 2021)

Non-fiction
 Fear No Poetry!: An Essential Guide to Close Reading (Ethos Books, 2014) 
 Spiaking Singlish: A Companion to How Singaporeans Communicate (Marshall-Cavendish International, 2017)

Translations
 The Leeter Tunku (Edition Tintenfaß, 2019)  - Singlish translation of Antoine de Saint-Exupéry's The Little Prince.
 The Tale of Peter Labbit (Edition Tintenfaß, 2021)  - Singlish-English edition of Beatrix Potter's The Tale of Peter Rabbit.
 Grimms' Fairy Tales in Singlish: Ten Chewren's and Household Tales (Edition Tintenfaß, 2021)  - Singlish translation of the Brothers Grimm's Children's and Household Tales.

Picture book
 Amazing Things (Yinthway Foundation, 2019)

Fiction
 2719 (Ethos Books, 2020)

Monograph
 Mein Kampf Re-Examined (NUS Department of English Language and Literature, 1996)

Edited volumes
 Sharing Borders: Studies in Contemporary Singaporean-Malaysian Literature II (National Library Board and National Arts Council Singapore, 2009)  (hbk),  (pbk)
 From the Window of the Epoch: An Anthology of Malaysian and Singaporean Poems, edited with Shamsudin Othman, Mohamed Pitchay Gani bin Mohamed Abdul Aziz, Tan Chee Lay, and Seetha Lakshmi (National Institute of Translation Malaysia and National Arts Council Singapore, 2010) 
 Telltale: Eleven Stories (Ethos Books and National Arts Council Singapore, 2010) 
 Man/Born/Free: Writings on the Human Spirit from Singapore (Ethos Books, 2011) 
 Edwin Thumboo - Time Travelling: A Select Annotated Bibliography (With Recollections and Critical Essays), edited with Michelle Heng (National Library Board Singapore, 2012).  (hbk),  (pbk)
 Singathology: 50 New Works by Celebrated Singaporean Writers, 2 volumes (National Arts Council Singapore and Marshall Cavendish Editions, 2015) , 
 Written Country: The History of Singapore through Literature (Landmark Books, 2016) 
 Places: A Graphic Anthology on the East of Singapore (National Library Board Singapore, 2016) 
 Stranger to My World: The Covid Diary of a Bangladeshi Migrant Worker, by MD Sharif Uddin (Landmark Books, 2021)

References

Living people
Academic staff of the National University of Singapore
Singaporean people of Chinese descent
Anglo-Chinese School alumni
Anglo-Chinese Junior College alumni
National University of Singapore alumni
Alumni of Queen Mary University of London
Year of birth missing (living people)